were a numbered series of World War II trade convoys between Japan and Singapore. Merchant ships from Moji and Kaibōkan from Sasebo formed southbound convoys in Imari Bay to carry supplies for the Burma Campaign. Northbound convoys transported food, petroleum, and raw materials to Japan from the captured European colonies of the Dutch East Indies, French Indochina, and British Malaya and Burma. These convoys were initiated in mid-1943 to protect fast, high-value tankers and troopships from the improved effectiveness of Mark 14 torpedoes carried by United States submarines.

Convoy routing was through the East China Sea, Formosa Strait, and South China Sea. Ships often joined or left convoys at the Formosan ports of Takao and Keelung, at the Mako naval base in the Pescadores, and at the Vietnamese ports of Cape Saint Jacques and Cam Ranh Bay. Some convoys stopped at Manila until MATA and TAMA feeder convoys between MAnila and TAkao enabled Hi convoys to avoid United States submarine wolfpacks in the Luzon Strait by hugging the Asian coast between Hainan and Shanghai.

Convoy dates

Sources

Notes

Pacific convoys of World War II